Lê Ý Tông (黎懿宗 29 March 1719 – 10 August 1759) was the third-last emperor of the Vietnamese Lê dynasty, reigning only nominally under the power of Trịnh Giang of the Trịnh lords. He reigned from 1735 to 1740 and was succeeded by Lê Hiển Tông.

References

Lê dynasty emperors
Vietnamese retired emperors
1719 births
1759 deaths
18th-century Vietnamese monarchs
Vietnamese monarchs